The former First Church of Christ, Scientist, now the Little Rock Community Church, is a historic church building at 2000 South Louisiana Street in Little Rock, Arkansas.  It is a single-story Mission style building, designed by noted Arkansas architect John Parks Almand and completed in 1919.  Characteristics of the Mission style include the low-pitch tile hip roof, overhanging eaves with exposed rafter ends, and smooth plaster walls.  The building also has modest Classical features, found in pilaster capitals and medallions of plaster and terra cotta.  The building is local significant for its architecture.  It was built for the local Christian Science congregation, which in 1950 sold it to an Evangelical Methodist congregation.  That congregation has since severed its association with the Evangelical Methodist movement, and is now known as the Little Rock Community Church.

The building was listed on the National Register of Historic Places in 1984, and was included in a 1988 expansion of the Governor's Mansion Historic District.

See also
National Register of Historic Places in Little Rock, Arkansas
List of former Christian Science churches, societies and buildings
 First Church of Christ, Scientist (disambiguation)

References

Churches on the National Register of Historic Places in Arkansas
Former Christian Science churches, societies and buildings in the United States
Churches in Little Rock, Arkansas
Culture of Little Rock, Arkansas
Christian organizations established in 1919
Churches completed in 1919
National Register of Historic Places in Little Rock, Arkansas
Historic district contributing properties in Arkansas